The Hong Kong Film Awards (HKFA), founded in 1982, is an annual film awards ceremony in Hong Kong. The ceremonies are typically in April. The awards recognise achievement in various aspects of filmmaking, such as directing, screenwriting, acting and cinematography. The awards are the Hong Kong equivalent to the American Academy Awards.

The HKFA, incorporated into Hong Kong Film Awards Association Ltd. since December 1993, are currently managed by a board of directors, which consists of representatives from thirteen professional film bodies in Hong Kong. Voting on eligible films for the HKFA is conducted January through March every year and is open to all registered voters, which include local film workers as well as critics, and a selected group of adjudicators.

General rules
The Hong Kong Film Awards are open to all Hong Kong films which are longer than an hour and commercially released in Hong Kong within the previous calendar year. A film qualifies as a Hong Kong film if it satisfies two of the three criteria, namely: the film director is a Hong Kong resident, at least one film company is registered in Hong Kong, and at least six persons of the production crew are Hong Kong residents. Since 2002, the HKFA also feature a Best Asian Film category, which accepts non-Hong Kong films which are commercially released in Hong Kong.

In January each year, a first round of election, open to all registered voters and a selected group of 100 professional adjudicators, is held to determine the five nominees for each award category. In the rare case where there is a tie between two nominees within the top five slots, six nominees will be allowed. Nominations are usually announced in February, after which a second round of election is held to determine the winner. Voting in the second round is open to a group of 50 professional adjudicators, Executive Committee members of the HKFA, as well as members of the thirteen professional film bodies. Each voting group holds a percentage of the ultimate score for each nominee, and each film body holds a higher share in the categories associated with it.

Board of directors
The Board of Directors consists of representatives from thirteen professional film bodies in Hong Kong, listed below.
City Entertainment
Hong Kong Kowloon and New Territories Motion Picture Industry Association
Hong Kong Film Directors' Guild
Hong Kong Theatres Association
Hong Kong Society of Cinematographers
Hong Kong Movie Production Executives Association
Hong Kong Cinematography Lighting Association
Hong Kong Stuntman Association
Hong Kong Screen Writer's Guild
Hong Kong Performing Artistes Guild
Hong Kong Film Arts Association
Hong Kong Society of Film Editors
Hong Kong Chamber of Films

Categories
The Hong Kong Film Awards currently feature 19 regular categories, listed below.

Best Film
Best Director
Best Screenplay
Best Actor
Best Actress
Best Supporting Actor
Best Supporting Actress
Best New Performer
Best New Director
Best Cinematography
Best Film Editing
Best Art Direction
Best Costume Make Up Design
Best Action Choreography
Best Original Film Score
Best Sound Design
Best Original Film Song
Best Visual Effects
Best Asian Chinese Language Film

History

Records

Mosts
 Most wins for a film: The Grandmaster — won 12 awards in 2014, including Best Film, Best Director, Best Screenplay, Best Actress, Best Supporting Actor, Best Cinematography, Best Film Editing, Best Art Direction, Best Costume & Make Up Design, Best Action Choreography, Best Sound Design and Best Original Film Score.
 Most wins for Best Director: Ann Hui — awarded 6 times in 1983, 1996, 2009, 2012, 2015 and 2018.
 Most wins for Best Actor: Tony Leung Chiu Wai — awarded 5 times in 1995, 1998, 2001, 2003 and 2005.
 Most wins for Best Actress: Maggie Cheung — awarded 5 times in 1990, 1993, 1997, 1998 and 2001.
 Most wins for Best Supporting Actor: Tony Leung Chiu Wai, Paul Chun, Anthony Wong Chau Sang, Liu Kai-Chi, and Eric Tsang with 2 times each.
 Most wins for Best Supporting Actress: Elaine Jin — awarded 4 times in 1987, 1988, 2016 and 2017.
 Most nominations for a film: Bodyguards and Assassins — received 18 nominations in 2010 and won 8 including Best Film.
 Most nominations for Best Director: Johnnie To — nominated 18 times between his first nomination in 1990 and his latest in 2017.
 Most nominations for Best Actor: Lau Ching-wan — nominated 16 times between his first nomination in 1994 and his latest in 2015.
 Most nominations for Best Actress: Sylvia Chang — nominated 11 times between her first nomination in 1983 and her latest in 2018.
 Most nominations without win: Chin Ka-lok — nominated 13 times between his first nomination for Best Supporting Actor in 1996 and his latest for Best Action Choreography in 2020, and not a single win.
 Most consecutive wins in the same category: Arthur Wong, awarded Best Cinematography in 1998, 1999 and 2000; Kinson Tsang, awarded Best Sound Design in 2016, 2017 and 2018.

Firsts
 First winner: Kara Hui — awarded Best Actress in the 1st Hong Kong Film Awards, making her the first recipient of the Hong Kong Film Awards.
 First non-Hong Kong resident winner: Song Hongrong — born in Mainland China, awarded Best Art Direction in 1984.
 First non-Hong Kong resident winner for Best Actor: Jet Li — born in Mainland China, awarded Best Actor in 2008 for his role in film The Warlords.
 First non-Hong Kong resident winner for Best Actress: Siqin Gaowa — born in Mainland China, awarded Best Actress in 1985 for her role in film Homecoming.

Special
 The films winning all 5 major awards (film, director, screenplay, actor, actress): Summer Snow by Ann Hui in 1996, and is succeeded by A Simple Life — also directed by Ann Hui in 2012.

Best 100 Chinese Motion Pictures
To celebrate a century of Chinese cinema, the Hong Kong Film Awards unveiled a list of Best 100 Chinese Motion Pictures (which in fact includes 103 films) during the 24th Hong Kong Film Awards ceremony on 27 March 2005. The list, selected by a panel of 101 filmmakers, critics and scholars, includes 24 films from Mainland China (11 from pre-1949 and 13 from post-1949), 61 from Hong Kong, 16 from Taiwan, and 2 co-productions.

Presenters

See also
 Hong Kong Film Awards statue, Avenue of Stars
 Hong Kong International Film Festival

Notes

References

External links
 "The 26th Hong Kong Film Awards - Rules of Election". Retrieved on 2007-04-21.
 香港电影金像奖，不少经典片段 - The Hong Kong Film Awards: Many classic moments, a news article about The 30th Hong Kong Film Awards, Thinking Chinese.
 Hong Kong Film Awards Official Site

 
Awards established in 1982
1982 establishments in Hong Kong